Did I Ever Tell You How Lucky You Are? is a children's book written and illustrated by Theodor Geisel under the pen name Dr. Seuss and published by Random House on September 12, 1973.

Plot
The text consists of a series of descriptive poems, fictively told to an unnamed listener by a wise old man. The man describes a variety of whimsically wretched characters and unfortunate situations, in comparison with which the listener might be considered exceptionally fortunate.

Adaptations
An audio version by John Cleese was nominated for a Grammy Award for Best Spoken Word Album for Children in 1994.

Further reading 
Rosenburg, Alyssa (2021). "The Great Dr. Seuss Hysteria of 2021 shows how silly and unimaginative adults can be". The Washington Post.

"Current Issue: Representations of Education in Youth Literature". Research on Diversity in Youth Literature | St. Catherine University, Feb. 2019, https://sophia.stkate.edu/rdyl/.

Elizabeth "Scout" Blum, Dr. Seuss's The Lorax: A 50th Anniversary Retrospective, Environmental History, Volume 26, Issue 4, October 2021, Pages 789–792, https://doi.org/10.1093/envhis/emab057

Mgr. Jana Hegerová, Mgr. Jana. "Dr. Seuss's Books in Schools". Popularity of Dr. Seuss and the Use of His Books in Language Classes, edited by Alena Dobrovolná.

American picture books
Books by Dr. Seuss
1973 children's books
Random House books
Works originally published in Redbook